Mark Lawson (born November 22, 1980) is an American politician who has served in the Oklahoma House of Representatives from the 30th district since 2016.

References

1980 births
Living people
Republican Party members of the Oklahoma House of Representatives
21st-century American politicians